Proteus Airlines Flight 706 was a scheduled commuter flight from Lyon, France to Lorient, France. On July 30, 1998, the Beechcraft 1900D operating the flight collided in mid-air with a Cessna 177 over Quiberon Bay. This accident was known as Quiberon Bay mid-air collision. Both aircraft crashed in the sea, killing fifteen people.

Accident
Flight 706 took off from Lyon–Saint-Exupéry at 12:21 local time on a flight to Lorient Lann-Bihoué airport. About seventy minutes into the flight, the crew made a request to the Lorient approach controller to deviate from their route slightly to the west to Quiberon Bay. The reason for this detour was to give the passengers and crew a view of the SS Norway (previously named SS France), at that time the longest ocean liner ever built in France. Later examinations of the 1900D's cockpit voice recorder revealed that a passenger made his way to the cockpit and told the pilot and co-pilot of the presence of the Norway nearby, then suggested that the crew fly the aircraft closer to the ship. At the time of this request, a Cessna 177 registered F-GAJE belonging to a local flying club took off from the airfield at Vannes for a local flight to Quiberon. 

At 13:57 the Proteus crew announced to the Lorient approach controller that they had reached the end of their 360° turn and asked to take a direct course for Lorient. After they received confirmation of this request at 13:58, the Proteus crew's aircraft collided with the Cessna. The cockpit voice recording ended at the moment of collision, and the flight data recording ended two seconds later; in those two seconds, the airplane rolled from 7.1 to 56 degrees left and pitched down 95 degrees. Both aircraft immediately fell to the water, killing all 14 passengers and crew on board the Beechcraft, as well as the sole occupant of the 177.

Investigation

The investigation found that the Cessna's transponder had not been switched on. 
In documentation published by the Aeronautical Information Service in 1997 and 1998 and probably used by the pilot of the Cessna, the use of a transponder while operating under visual flight rules could be interpreted as optional. As a result of the transponder being off, the Cessna was not depicted on the radar screen of the Lorient approach controller and its traffic information could not be relayed to the crew of the Beechcraft. In communicating with an AFIS controller at Quiberon, the pilot of the Cessna was likewise not informed of the presence of the Beechcraft. While a traffic collision avoidance system (TCAS) system on the Beechcraft would not have prevented the accident without the Cessna's transponder operating, the report also noted that the BF Goodrich TCAS installed in the Beechcraft at the factory had been removed due to not yet being approved for operation in France. Had the Cessna's transponder not been turned off and the Beechcraft's TCAS not been uninstalled, a pilot with expected reaction time would likely have avoided the collision by about 300 feet.

The investigation also revealed that the organization of activity in the Beechcraft's cockpit as well as its ergonomics during the left-hand 360° turn did not allow for effective monitoring during the merger of the two aircraft, particularly to the outside of the turn, placing the Cessna in the Beechcraft's blind spot. The position of the sun as well as the configuration of the Cessna's fuselage and nose cowling were thought to have impeded the view of the Cessna's pilot in the moments just prior to the collision.

Following this accident, the BEA recommended that pilots should only cancel instrument flight rules flight plans in cases of necessity.

Dramatization
This accident was featured in the 16th season of the Canadian TV series Mayday. It aired on 5 July 2016 and is titled Deadly Detour.

See also
List of notable mid-air collisions
PSA Flight 182
Aeromexico Flight 498
DHL Flight 611 / Bashkirian Airlines Flight 2937
United Flight 718 / Trans World Airlines Flight 2
Gol Transportes Aéreos Flight 1907

References

External links
 RAPPORT relatif à l'abordage survenu le 30 juillet 1998 en baie de Quiberon (56) entre le Beech 1900D immatriculé F-GSJM exploité par Proteus Airlines et le Cessna 177 immatriculé F-GAJE - BEA France 
 

1998 in France
Aviation accidents and incidents in 1998
Aviation accidents and incidents in France
Accidents and incidents involving the Beechcraft 1900
Mid-air collisions
Mid-air collisions involving airliners
Mid-air collisions involving general aviation aircraft
July 1998 events in Europe